Echard, Échard or Eachard are surnames, and may refer to:

 Christopher Echard
 Jacques Échard (1644 - 1724), French Dominican and historian
 John Eachard (1636? - 1697), English clergyman and satirist
 Laurence Echard (c 1670 - 1730), English historian and clergyman
 Raoul Echard (1883 - 1922), French flying ace